Ihor Viktorovich "Igor" Chibirev (born April 19, 1968) is a retired Ukrainian ice hockey centre. He played in the National Hockey League for the Hartford Whalers.

Career
Chibirev began his career in the Vysshaya Liga for SKA Kalinin before moving to the Soviet Hockey League for CSKA Moscow.  After a spell in the International Hockey League for the Fort Wayne Komets, Chibirev was drafted 266th overall by the Hartford Whalers in the 1993 NHL Entry Draft and over two seasons he played 45 regular season games for the Whalers, scoring 7 goals and 12 assists for 19 points.  Three of those goals came in an 8-4 Hartford road win over the Pittsburgh Penguins on April 5, 1995. In 1995, he moved to Switzerland's Nationalliga A and signed for HC Ambri-Piotta and spent three seasons with the team, which included a short spell in Austria with EC KAC.  Chibirev later moved to HC Fribourg-Gottéron for one season before moving to Germany's Deutsche Eishockey Liga with the Hannover Scorpions where he remained until his retirement in 2002.  He represented the Ukraine national ice hockey team at the 2002 Winter Olympics.

Career statistics

Regular season and playoffs

International

External links
 

1968 births
Fort Wayne Komets players
Hannover Scorpions players
Hartford Whalers draft picks
Hartford Whalers players
HC Ambrì-Piotta players
HC CSKA Moscow players
HC Fribourg-Gottéron players
Ice hockey players at the 2002 Winter Olympics
EC KAC players
Living people
Olympic ice hockey players of Ukraine
Soviet ice hockey centres
Sportspeople from Penza
Springfield Indians players
Ukrainian ice hockey coaches
Ukrainian ice hockey centres
Ukrainian expatriate sportspeople in the United States